PeoplePlus is a recruitment and training provider based in Birmingham, United Kingdom The company runs a range of frontline public services including employability support, adult skills training, apprenticeships, independent living, and prison education as well as offering recruitment and training for employers.

PeoplePlus is owned by Staffline Group PLC, the UK’s largest outsourced workforce provider with a turnover in excess of £1.1bn in 2018.

History
In 2011, Staffline Group acquired EOS, a small work programme provider in the West Midlands. This was followed in 2014 with the acquisition of Avanta, one of the largest prime work programme providers in the UK, and finally in 2015 the purchase of another prime provider A4e. In 2015 the 3 companies were merged to form PeoplePlus.

In 2018, PeoplePlus made a further acquisition of LearnDirect Apprenticeships, making them the largest apprenticeship provider in the UK. The apprenticeship provision was subsequently sold in 2020 to Babington.

Current Operations 

PeoplePlus delivers government contracts in employability – notably the DWP’s largest employability contract ‘The Restart Scheme’ where they sub-contract to Reed and Serco. They also deliver enterprise, justice, adult education and community services, as well as providing corporate solutions to private clients in the fields of wellbeing, learning, development and talent recruitment.

Employability 
In England and Wales, PeoplePlus were the largest prime provider of DWP’s Work Programme before it ended in 2019. In 2018 they began delivering Fair Start Scotland in Glasgow and Highlands & Islands - a voluntary programme with support to develop soft skills and find sustainable employment. In England and Wales, they deliver the DWP’s Restart Scheme on behalf of Reed in Kent and the North East, and Serco in Wales. The Restart Scheme aims to support people back into work as well as offering in-work support for up to twelve months.

Enterprise 
PeoplePlus enterprise services provide training and advice for starting a business or becoming self employed.

Support for Employees 

PeoplePlus also encourages employers to recruit in a socially responsible way and helps to facilitate moving those from disadvantaged backgrounds into sustainable employment.  

They also write 'A Health and Well-being division brings together a range of services to proactively address and improve well-being in the workplace' via their 'YouCan’ programme.

Adult Education 
Adult skills programmes delivered across England provide unemployed people with the skills for employment. Qualifications delivered include Health and Social Care, Retail, Security, Warehousing and Distribution, Forklift Truck Driving, Customer Service, Hospitality, Engineering, Catering, Functional Skills, and IT. They offer online and offline courses, and have a physical footprint in Middlesbrough, Tees Valley, Bradford, Manchester, Sheffield, and Liverpool.

Justice 
In 2019 PeoplePlus more than doubled its prison education services with additional contracts worth £100m and now provide education services in 26 prisons in Britain.

Health & Social Care 
PeoplePlus also provides support for Direct Payments for 26 local authorities across England and Wales. On behalf of district councils, they manage the payroll and recruitment of personal care assistants so people can remain independent in their own homes for longer.

References

Business services companies established in 2015
Education companies established in 2015
Companies based in Nottingham
Training companies of the United Kingdom
Unemployment in the United Kingdom
Workfare in the United Kingdom
2015 establishments in England